The discography of Theophilus London, an American rapper and singer, consists of three studio albums, three mixtapes, three extended plays, ten singles, and several collaborations and compilation appearances.

Albums

Studio albums

Mixtapes

Remix albums

Extended plays

Singles

As lead artist

As featured artist

Guest appearances

Soundtracks
"Neighbors" - The Twilight Saga: Breaking Dawn – Part 1 (2011)
"All Around the World" - Madden NFL 12 (2012)
"Girls Girls $" - Neighbors (2014)

References 

Hip hop discographies
Discographies of American artists